Susiec  is a village and holiday resort in Tomaszów Lubelski County, Lublin Voivodeship, in southeastern Poland. It is the seat of the gmina (administrative district) called Gmina Susiec.

Polish film director Sylwester Chęciński was born here.

See also
 Roztocze
 Roztocze National Park

References

Villages in Tomaszów Lubelski County